Juraj Mikúš may refer to the following:

Juraj Mikúš (ice hockey, born 1987), Slovak ice hockey centre
Juraj Mikuš (ice hockey, born 1988), Slovak ice hockey defenceman